Suppesville is an unincorporated community in Sumner County, Kansas, United States.  It is located about 3.5 miles east of Norwich, or 7.5 miles southwest of Viola, at the intersection of N Argonia Rd and K-42 highway.

Education
The community is served by Kingman–Norwich USD 331 public school district.

References

Further reading

External links
 Sumner County map, KDOT

Unincorporated communities in Kansas
Unincorporated communities in Sumner County, Kansas